The Kugitang Formation or Group is an Oxfordian geologic formation in Tajikistan and Uzbekistan and a geologic group in Turkmenistan. Dinosaur remains diagnostic to the genus level are among the fossils that have been recovered from the formation.

Fossil content 
Among the following fossils have been found in the Kugitang Svita:

Dinosaurs
 Chodjapilesaurus krimholzi
 Gissarosaurus tetrafalangensis

Ichnofossils
 Megalosauripus uzbekistanicus
 Mirsosauropus tursunzadei
 Regarosauropus manovi
 Shirkentosauropus shirkentensis
 Therangospodus pandemicus

Insects
 Shurabia hissarica

Reef fauna
 Apocladophyllia koniakensis
 Calamophylliopsis kyrvakarensis
 Dorsoplicathyris farcinata
 Kobyastraea lomontiana
 Tubegatanella repmanae
 Bivalvia indet.

See also 
 List of dinosaur-bearing rock formations
 List of stratigraphic units with few dinosaur genera
 Bissekty Formation
 Bostobe Formation
 Qiketai, Toutunhe, Shishugou and Qigu Formations, fossiliferous formations of the Junggar Basin, Xinjiang
 Haifanggou Formation, Hebei Basin, Hebei
 Oxfordian formations
 Oxford Clay, England
 Tendaguru Formation, fossiliferous formation of Tanzania
 Cañadón Calcáreo Formation, fossiliferous formation of the Cañadón Asfalto Basin, Argentina

References

Bibliography

Further reading 
 F. Fanti, M. Contessi, A. Nigarov and P. Esenov. 2013. New data on two large dinosaur tracksites from the Upper Jurassic of eastern Turkmenistan (Central Asia). Ichnos 20:54-71
  D. S. Aristov, T. Wappler, and A. P. Rasnitsyn. 2009. New and Little-Known Grylloblattids of the Family Geinitziidae (Insecta: Grylloblattida) from the Triassic and Jurassic of Europe, Asia, and South Africa. Paleontological Journal 43:418-424 
 V. P. Novikov and M. R. Dzhalilov. 1988. Litologicheskaya interpretatsiya mestonakhozhdeniy sledov dinozavrov i Tadzhikistane [A lithological interpretation of localities with dinosaurian traces in Tajikistan]. In T. N. Bogdanova, L. I. Khosatzky, & A. A. Istchenko (eds.), Sledy Zhiznedeyatel'nosti i Dinamika Sredy v Drevnikh Biotopakh. Trudy XXX Sessii Vsesoyuznogo Paleontologicheskogo Obshchestva i VII Sessii Ukrainskogo Paleontologicheskogo Obshchestva [Fossil Traces of Vital Activity and Dynamics of the Environment in Ancient Biotopes. Transactions of the XXX Session of All-Union Paleontological Society and the VII Session of the Ukrainian Paleontological Society]. Naukova Dumka, Kiev 58-69
 S. T. Khusanov. 1987. Pozdneyurskie skleraktinii rifogennykh otlozheniy yuzhnogo i zapadnogo Uzbekistana [Upper Jurassic Scleractinia from reefal buildups in southern and western Uzbekistan] 1-92

Geologic groups of Asia
Geologic formations of Tajikistan
Geologic formations of Turkmenistan
Geologic formations of Uzbekistan
Jurassic System of Asia
Kimmeridgian Stage
Oxfordian Stage
Limestone formations
Mudstone formations
Reef deposits
Shallow marine deposits
Ichnofossiliferous formations
Fossiliferous stratigraphic units of Asia
Paleontology in Tajikistan
Paleontology in Turkmenistan
Paleontology in Uzbekistan